Saint Vincent-Ein Kerem is a home for physically and mentally handicapped children in Israel.

History
Saint Vincent was founded in 1954 at Ein Kerem, on the edge of Jerusalem. It is a non-profit enterprise operated by the Daughters of Charity of Saint Vincent de Paul. The home cares for disabled children with the help of volunteers from around the world.

References

External links
Official site

Buildings and structures in Jerusalem
Catholic charities
Disability organizations based in Israel
Organizations based in Jerusalem
1954 establishments in Israel

he:עין כרם#מנזר סנט וינסנט